Tömür Dawamat (June 16, 1927 – December 19, 2018) was the chairman of the Xinjiang Uyghur Autonomous Region of the People's Republic of China from 1985 to 1993.

Tömür was an ethnic Uyghur. He started his working career in May 1950 and later became the local leader from 1954 to 1964. He held a high position in the Xinjiang Uyghur Autonomous Region Revolution Committee from 1968 to 1979 and then became Chief of the People's Congress of the Xinjiang Uyghur Autonomous Region before he took office as the chairman of Xinjiang in 1985. After his chairmanship, he was a member of the Standing Committee of the National People's Congress.

Tömür Dawamat died on December 19, 2018, at the age of 91.

References

1927 births
2018 deaths
People from Turpan
People's Republic of China politicians from Xinjiang
Uyghurs
Political office-holders in Xinjiang
Chinese Communist Party politicians from Xinjiang
Members of the 12th Central Committee of the Chinese Communist Party
Members of the 13th Central Committee of the Chinese Communist Party
Members of the 14th Central Committee of the Chinese Communist Party
Vice Chairpersons of the National People's Congress
Uyghur politicians
Burials at Babaoshan Revolutionary Cemetery